Adult-oriented rock or AOR has multiple meanings in the music world and its meaning may vary upon location. It may refer to:

 Arena rock (also known as AOR, melodic rock and stadium rock), a style of commercially oriented rock music
 Album-oriented rock (AOR), a radio format created in the United States in the 1970s
 Adult album alternative, a radio format that evolved from album-oriented rock
 Adult-oriented rock, a synonym for soft rock
 West Coast sound, a mid-to-late 1970s rock subgenre, more recently referred to as yacht rock

See also
 AOR (disambiguation)